Season two of Quantum Leap ran on NBC from September 20, 1989 to May 9, 1990. The series follows the exploits of Dr. Sam Beckett and his project Quantum Leap, through which he involuntarily leaps through spacetime, temporarily taking over a host in order to correct historical mistakes. Season two consists of 22 episodes.

For his work this season, Dean Stockwell won the Golden Globe for Best Supporting Actor – Series, Miniseries or Television Film, while the episode "Pool Hall Blues" won the series its second of three consecutive Primetime Emmy Awards for Outstanding Cinematography,

Episodes

References

Quantum Leap seasons
1989 American television seasons
1990 American television seasons